Dawn Primarolo, Baroness Primarolo,  (born 2 May 1954) is a British Labour Party politician who was the Member of Parliament for Bristol South from 1987 until 2015, when she stood down. She was Minister of State for Children, Young People and Families at the Department for Children, Schools and Families from June 2009 to May 2010 and a Deputy Speaker of the House of Commons from 2010 to 2015. She was appointed Dame Commander of the Order of the British Empire (DBE) in the 2014 Birthday Honours for political service. She was nominated for a life peerage in the 2015 Dissolution Honours.

Early life and career
Born in London, Primarolo was raised in Crawley, West Sussex, where she attended Thomas Bennett comprehensive school. She then studied at Bristol Polytechnic as a bookkeeper and legal secretary. Returning to London, in 1973 she joined the Labour Party whilst employed as a legal secretary in an east London Law Centre.

After marrying, she moved back to Bristol to raise her son. She then studied for a social science degree at Bristol Polytechnic, where she gained a BA (Hons). Whilst working, she then continued her studies at the University of Bristol, where she registered for a PhD research into women and housing. She did not finish the PhD, but was awarded an honorary doctorate by the university in 2016.

Becoming involved in her local community, Primarolo belonged to various women's groups and was active in the Campaign for Nuclear Disarmament, a founder member of Windmill Hill City Farm, and a school governor.

Active in her local Labour Party, in 1985 she was elected to Avon County Council, where she acted as vice chair of the Equal Opportunities Committee.

Parliamentary career
Primarolo was first elected to Parliament at the 1987 general election, after the constituency party de-selected Michael Cocks, the sitting MP. She gained attention in 1989 by asking Margaret Thatcher if the only hope for low-paid women was "to follow her example and find herself a wealthy husband". She was reading out a question on behalf of Ann Clwyd, at the time, who had "lost her voice". Thatcher dismissed the question as 'cheap'. She served as opposition spokesperson for health from 1992 to 1994 and the Treasury from 1994 to 1997.

At the time she was first elected, Primarolo was considered to be on the hard left, but later became a New Labour loyalist, leading Andrew Roth of The Guardian to say she has "changed from 'Red Dawn' to 'Rosy Pink'"; As part of this change, she shifted from support for the Campaign for Nuclear Disarmament (CND), the rise of which originally led her into politics, to voting for the renewal of Britain's Trident nuclear deterrent.

Despite campaigning against the first Gulf War in 1991, she voted in favour of the Iraq War in 2003, and against any investigation into the invasion after it had taken place. On other 'key issues' (as described by TheyWorkForYou), she has voted in favour of ID cards and increased university tuition fees.

Primarolo served as Financial Secretary to the Treasury from 1997 to 1999 and as Paymaster General from 1999 to 2007. As Paymaster General, Primarolo was responsible for the administration of the working tax credit system, which was a system that contributed to raising millions of children out of poverty. However, the administration of this system received some criticism, including allegations that some families were left less well off as a result. In 2003, a Treasury select committee member accused her of "losing control of [her] department" after it became known that Inland Revenue buildings under Primarolo's purview had been sold to tax-haven companies. This came shortly after she had "insisted ... the Child tax credit scheme was a 'success'", despite Inland Revenue staff walking out in protest against the pressure under which they were placed. She was also responsible for introducing the controversial IR35 tax rules which were designed to tax "disguised employment" at a rate similar to employment. The measure was controversial as it was seen by some as unfair. Primarolo was also the longest serving Paymaster General in the office's 200-year history. Primarolo was named Chairman of the Code of Conduct Group upon its establishment by ECOFIN in March 1998.

In 2005, PM Tony Blair was forced to apologise after a report by the Parliamentary Ombudsman that Primarolo had failed to give Parliament accurate information. Primarolo admitted at the same time that she had been fully aware "about the extent of the problems".

As Minister of State for Public Health from 2007 to 2009, Primarolo was responsible for health improvement and health protection issues including such areas as tobacco, obesity, drugs and sexual health, as well as international business, pharmacy and research and development.

On 5 June 2009 Primarolo was moved, this time succeeding Beverley Hughes as Minister of State for Children, Young People and Families at the Department for Children, Schools and Families. This gave her the right to attend cabinet when her responsibilities were on the agenda.

Primarolo's abilities as a minister have been questioned, with former Prime Minister Tony Blair revealing in his autobiography A Journey that he did not think she was "right for government" but had to give her a job because she was one of Gordon Brown's key allies; and political commentator Danny Finkelstein arguing that she was "contender no. 1" for title of "Labour's worst Minister". Jonathan Powell, Blair's Chief of Staff, is reported as saying "We fired Dawn Primarolo about ten times. And each time Gordon (Brown) insisted we put her back."

Deputy Speaker
Primarolo joined the Shadow Cabinet as Shadow Minister for Children when Labour entered opposition in May 2010. In June 2010 she became a Deputy Speaker of the House of Commons. In November 2011 she announced her intention to stand down from Parliament at the next general election.

Primarolo was created a life peer taking the title Baroness Primarolo, of Windmill Hill in the City of Bristol on 26 October 2015.

2022 Infected Blood Inquiry 
In July 2022 Primarolo provided written evidence to the Infected Blood Inquiry. In September 2022 she provided spoken evidence.

Personal life
Primarolo married UNISON regional secretary Ian Ducat in Bristol in 1990.

References

External links
Bristol South Labour Party

The Rt Hon Dawn Primarolo MP  Department of Health (archived)

|-

|-

|-

|-

|-

1954 births
20th-century British women politicians
21st-century British women politicians
Alumni of the University of Bristol
Alumni of the University of the West of England, Bristol
Councillors in South West England
Dames Commander of the Order of the British Empire
Deputy Speakers of the British House of Commons
English people of Italian descent
Female members of the Parliament of the United Kingdom for English constituencies
Labour Party (UK) MPs for English constituencies
Labour Party (UK) life peers
Life peeresses created by Elizabeth II
Living people
Members of Parliament for Bristol
Members of the Privy Council of the United Kingdom
Ministers for children, young people and families
People from Crawley
Politics of Bristol
UK MPs 1987–1992
UK MPs 1992–1997
UK MPs 1997–2001
UK MPs 2001–2005
UK MPs 2005–2010
UK MPs 2010–2015
UK MPs who were granted peerages
United Kingdom Paymasters General
Women councillors in England
Women government ministers in the United Kingdom
Women legislative deputy speakers